Venkatacher Kalpana (born 18 July 1961) is a former Test and One Day International cricketer who represented India. She is a right hand batsman and wicket-keeper. She has played three Tests and eight ODIs. She jointly with Sarah Illingworth holds the record for effecting the most dismissals as wicket-keeper in an innings of a Women's Cricket World Cup match

References

1961 births
Air India women cricketers
India women One Day International cricketers
India women Test cricketers
Indian women cricketers
Living people
Wicket-keepers